The Comunidade Intermunicipal do Cávado is an administrative division in northern Portugal. It was created in 2008. It is also a NUTS3 subregion of the Norte Region. The seat of the intermunicipal community is Braga, Norte. Cávado comprises part of the former Braga District. Currently, as of 2021, it has 416.679 inhabitants and a population density of 351 per square kilometres.

Its name is derived from the Cávado River that drains a large part of its territory. It borders the intermunicipal community of Ave and the Metropolitan Area of Porto to the south, Alto Tâmega to the east, Alto Minho to the north and the Atlantic Ocean to the west.

Municipalities
It is composed of six municipalities:

References

External links
Official website CIM Cávado

Intermunicipal communities of Portugal
Norte Region, Portugal